{{DISPLAYTITLE:C14H10O2}}
The molecular formula C14H10O2 (molar mass: 210.23 g/mol, exact mass: 210.0681 u) may refer to:

 Benzil
 9,10-Dihydroxyanthracene

Molecular formulas